Drunk is the third studio album by American musician Thundercat. It was released on February 24, 2017 by Brainfeeder. It features guest appearances from Kenny Loggins, Michael McDonald, Kendrick Lamar, Wiz Khalifa, Mac Miller, and Pharrell. It is his first studio album in nearly four years, his last studio album being Apocalypse. Drunk received positive reviews from music critics. A ChopNotSlop remix from OG Ron C, DJ Candlestick, & The Chopstars entitled 'Drank' was released as a special edition purple vinyl record.

Critical reception

Drunk received general praise from music critics. On the review aggregator website Metacritic the album received an aggregate score of 80 based on 26 reviews indicating "generally favourable reviews". Aggregator AnyDecentMusic? gave it 7.9 out of 10, based on their assessment of the critical consensus.

In a strongly positive review for Exclaim!, Daniel Sylvester praised Bruner's groove and ability to seemingly shift through song to song while changing a few things, but keeping that groove going well.

Accolades

Track listing

Personnel 

 Stephen "Thundercat" Bruner – vocals , bass , programming 
 Miguel Atwood-Ferguson – strings 
 S. Burris – synth-bass 
 Zane Carney – guitar 
 Louis Cole – drums , keyboards , programming , "basically everything" 
 Kevin "Daddy Kev" Moo – mastering
 Charles "Mono/Poly" Dickerson – keyboards , programming 
 Steven "Flying Lotus" Ellison – mixing, additional production , synthesizer , programming 
 Taylor Graves – keyboards , programming 
 Dennis Hamm – keyboards , piano , synthesizers 
 Kendrick Lamar – vocals 
 Kenny Loggins – vocals 
 Michael McDonald – vocals , keyboards 
 Harry Rabin – engineer 
 Mac Miller – vocals 
 Deantoni Parks – drums 
 Zack Sekoff – programming 
 Mark "Sounwave" Spears – production 
 Cameron "Wiz Khalifa" Thomaz – vocals 
 Kamasi Washington – saxophone 
 Pharrell Williams – vocals

Charts

References

External links
 

2017 albums
Brainfeeder albums
Thundercat (musician) albums
Albums produced by Thundercat (musician)
Albums produced by Flying Lotus
Albums produced by Sounwave